Hanns Eckelkamp (28 February 1927 – 5 August 2021) was a German film producer and founder of Atlas Filmverleih. He produced over 20 films between the 1960s and early 1990s, including three for director Rainer Werner Fassbinder − Satan's Brew, The Marriage of Maria Braun, and Lola. He also formed film distribution companies and a cinema chain.

References

External links
 
 Hanns Eckelkamp Filmproduktion

1927 births
2021 deaths
German film producers
People from Münster
Film people from North Rhine-Westphalia